National Route 32 is a national highway in South Korea connects Taean County to Jung District, Daejeon. It established on 31 August 1971.

Main stopovers

South Chungcheong Province
 Taean County - Seosan - Dangjin - Yesan County - Gongju
Sejong City
 Janggun-myeon
Daejeon
 Yuseong District - Seo District - Jung District

Major intersections

 (■): Motorway
IS: Intersection, IC: Interchange

South Chungcheong Province and Sejong City

Daejeon

References

32
Roads in South Chungcheong
Roads in Sejong
Roads in Daejeon